Adolf Frey was a Swiss footballer who played for FC Basel during the 1930s. He played forward.

Frey joined Basel's first team in 1931. He played his domestic league debut for the club in the away game on 6 September 1931 as Basel were defeated Lugano. He scored his first goal for his club on 7 May 1933 in the away game as Basel were defeated 6–3 by Biel-Bienne.

Between the years 1931 and 1934 Frey played a total of seven games for Basel scoring a total of three goals. Four of these games were in the Swiss Serie A and three were friendly games. He scored one goal in the domestic league and the other two were scored during the test games.

References

Sources
 Rotblau: Jahrbuch Saison 2017/2018. Publisher: FC Basel Marketing AG. 
 Die ersten 125 Jahre. Publisher: Josef Zindel im Friedrich Reinhardt Verlag, Basel. 
 Verein "Basler Fussballarchiv" Homepage

FC Basel players
Swiss men's footballers
Association football forwards